The 7th Central Committee of the Lao People's Revolutionary Party (LPRP) was elected at the 7th LPRP National Congress in 2001. It was composed of 53 members.

Members

References

Bibliography
 
 

7th Central Committee of the Lao People's Revolutionary Party
2001 establishments in Laos
2006 disestablishments in Laos